Anton "Toni" Palzer (born 11 March 1993) is a German ski mountaineer and cyclist. He is a member of the DAV section Berchtesgadener Land and of the German national selection.

Since April 2021, Palzer has joined  in road bicycle racing.

Career 
Born in Ramsau bei Berchtesgaden, Palzer attended the CJD Christophorusschule Berchtesgaden until 2009.

Competing in the cadets' class at the 2010 World Championship of Ski Mountaineering in Andorra, Palzer won the individual as well as the vertical race event.

In 2011, Palzer won Gold in the juniors' class individual and sprint race at the World Championship in Claut (Italy), and Silver in the juniors' vertical race. In 2012, during the European Championship in Pelvoux (France), he finished first in the juniors' individual and vertical race again. In both of these events, the 2011 World Championship as well as in the 2012 European Championship, he participated in the German seniors' relay race teams, which placed twice in the top ten.

Also in 2012, he won all the five races of the Youth World Cup.

Selected results 
 2011: 6th, World Championship, relay, together with Philipp Reiter, Anton Steurer and Konrad Lex
 2012: 5th, European Championship, relay, together with Josef Rottmoser, Philipp Reiter and Alexander Schuster

Grand Tour general classification results timeline

References

External links 
 , SkiMo Stats
 

1993 births
Living people
German male ski mountaineers
People from Berchtesgadener Land
Sportspeople from Upper Bavaria
German male cyclists
Cyclists from Bavaria